Carmignac is a French asset management firm founded in 1989 by Édouard Carmignac and Éric Helderlé. The firm is wholly employee-owned and has $44 billion of assets under management as of 2021, according to Forbes.

History 
After its founding in 1989 in Paris, the firm opened its first office abroad in Luxembourg in 1999. In 2008, offices were established in Madrid and Milan, followed by London (2012) and Zurich (2015).

In 2000, Carmignac’s assets amounted to €1 billion, reaching €13 billion in 2007. The firm’s flagship fund, Carmignac Patrimoine, largely resisted the financial crisis of 2008, which led to an increase in assets in the following years, and it became one of the largest funds in Europe for a while, according to the FT.

Recent developments 
In September 2018, it was announced that Édouard Carmignac would step down from running the Carmignac Investissement Fund, management of which passed to David Older.

Edouard Carmignac announced in January 2019 that he would step down as the portfolio manager of the Carmignac Patrimoine fund after holding this position for 30 years. Rose Ouahba and David Older succeeded Carmignac as dual leads of the Fund. However, Edouard Carmignac maintained his role as a member of the strategic investment committee and chief investment officer (CIO).

In June 2019, the company agreed to pay a €30 million as part of a settlement under a public interest judicial agreement against the discontinuation of proceedings by the National Financial Prosecutor's Office.

Funds managed 
As of 2019, Carmignac manages 21 investment strategies. These activities include, among others, equity and fixed income management.

In May 2019, it was announced that Carmignac launched six new OEICs funds in the United Kingdom in a push to increase its European presence beyond the French market. The funds are similar to those the firm is already managing in France. In April 2019, Marie-Anne Allier took over the co-management of Carmignac Sécurité Fond. In the same year, three of the company's funds were certified with the French SRI label for sustainable investment vehicles.

The firm launched two more funds in June that year, called the Carmignac Portfolio Grandchildren fund and the Carmignac Portfolio Family Governed fund. These aim to provide financial security to children.

References 

Investment companies
Investment companies of France